Lee Eun-Bi (born 23 October 1990, Samchok) is a South Korean handball player. She plays on the South Korean national team, and participated at the 2011 World Women's Handball Championship in Brazil.

She played for South Korea at the 2012 Summer Olympics, where South Korea narrowly lost the bronze medal match to Spain 31-29, and the 2016 Summer Olympics.

References

1990 births
Living people
South Korean female handball players
Handball players at the 2012 Summer Olympics
Handball players at the 2016 Summer Olympics
Asian Games medalists in handball
Handball players at the 2010 Asian Games
Handball players at the 2014 Asian Games
Olympic handball players of South Korea
Asian Games gold medalists for South Korea
Asian Games bronze medalists for South Korea
Universiade medalists in handball
Medalists at the 2010 Asian Games
Medalists at the 2014 Asian Games
Universiade silver medalists for South Korea
People from Samcheok
Medalists at the 2015 Summer Universiade
Sportspeople from Gangwon Province, South Korea